Pannaiyar, or Alagar, is an Indian caste , most of whose members are in Tamil Nadu, primarily in the Thoothukudi district and some in Kanyakumari, Tirunelveli and Ramanathapuram districts.

References

Indian castes
Social groups of Tamil Nadu
Indian surnames
Social groups of India